ArchLabs Linux is a lightweight rolling release Linux distribution based on a minimal Arch Linux operating system with the Openbox window manager. ArchLabs is inspired by BunsenLabs.

Features 
The ArchLabs distribution contains a text-based installer, "AL-Installer" as its installation method, as well as baph, an AUR helper.  The installer gives the user the ability to choose from 16 different assorted Desktop Environments and Window Managers as well as a selection of extra software, Linux Kernels, Display Managers and shells.

History 
Initial releases used the Calamares installer. Early versions of ArchLabs started to become bloated with many unnecessary applications and programs. This sparked a change in direction.  A slim down of the ISO size from over 2Gb in size down to approximately 580mb made download times a lot quicker.

Mínimo was the first of this minimal release with a change from the traditional Openbox panel, Tint2 to Polybar. Also introduced in this release was the original welcome script, named "AL-Hello" which was a nod to the "brother" distribution BunsenLabs. Mínimo was also the final release to have a release name, following releases followed a numbering pattern of YYYY.MM.

2018.02 release brought a new and improved AL-Hello welcome script and many additions and refining to the ArchLabs experience.

2018.07 saw more improvements to the newly written AL-Installer.

With the release of 2018.12 came the removal of the live environment and the post install script "AL-Hello". Options for choosing desktops and window managers as well as a selection of apps have been added to AL-Installer (ALI). Also introduced in this 2018.12 release was the in house AUR (Arch User Repository) Helper, baph (Basic AUR Package Helper).

2019.10.29 was ArchLabs third release for 2019 (After 2019.1.20 & 2019.10.28). Many changes were made including additional desktop environments and window managers added to the installer. Most notably, awesomewm and jwm.

ArchLabs first release of 2022 brought with it a new custom Window Manager called dk.  Also included is a custom panel and menu for the Sway Window Manager called nwg-shell.

The ArchLabs installer now includes 16 assorted Desktop Environments and Window Managers, such as i3, dwm, bspwm, LXQt, jwm, XFCE, Awesome, Fluxbox, KDE Plasma, Deepin, Gnome, and Cinnamon. Most are installed as the developer intended with no customisation.  Openbox, awesomewm, dk and Sway are the only customised environments supplied by the ArchLabs installer.

Release history 
The current release of ArchLabs Linux is "2023.02.05" , which was released on 5 February 2023.

References

External links 

 
 
 
 Community Forum
ArchLabs on OpenSourceFeed Gallery

 Reviews:
 DistroWatch Weekly, Issue 735, 23 October 2017
 ArchLabs Review: A Quick Look At The Rising Arch Based Linux Distribution | It's FOSS
 ArchLabs 2018.02: Schlankes Linux mit topaktueller Software | heise online 
 ArchLabs Makes Up for Parabola's Curve Balls | Reviews | LinuxInsider
 ArchLabs 5.0: One of the Best, Gets Even Better | Tux Machines

Arch-based Linux distributions
Operating system distributions bootable from read-only media
Pacman-based Linux distributions
Rolling Release Linux distributions
X86-64 Linux distributions
Linux distributions